The 2015 Louisiana Tech Bulldogs football team represented Louisiana Tech University in the 2015 NCAA Division I FBS football season as members of the West Division of Conference USA. They were led by third-year head coach Skip Holtz and played their home games at Joe Aillet Stadium in Ruston, Louisiana. They finished the season 9–4, 6–2 in C-USA play to finish in second place in the West Division. They were invited to the New Orleans Bowl where they defeated Arkansas State.

Schedule
Louisiana Tech announced their 2015 football schedule on February 2, 2015. The 2015 schedule consist of six home and away games in the regular season. The Bulldogs will host CUSA foes Florida International (FIU), North Texas, Middle Tennessee, and Southern Miss, and will travel to Rice, UTEP, UTSA, and Western Kentucky (WKU).

Schedule source:

Game summaries

Southern

at Western Kentucky

at Kansas State

FIU

Louisiana–Lafayette

at UTSA

at Mississippi State

Middle Tennessee

at Rice

North Texas

at Texas–El Paso

Southern Miss

Arkansas State–New Orleans Bowl

NFL Draft

References

Louisiana Tech
Louisiana Tech Bulldogs football seasons
New Orleans Bowl champion seasons
Louisiana Tech Bulldogs football